Roşieni may refer to several villages in Romania:

 Roşieni, a village in Mociu Commune, Cluj County
 Roşieni, a village in Breasta Commune, Dolj County
 Roşienii Mari and Roşienii Mici, villages in Dobrun Commune, Olt County

See also 
 Roșu (disambiguation)
 Roșia (disambiguation)
 Roșiori (disambiguation)
 Roșioara (disambiguation)